Patricia Bullrich (born 11 June 1956) is an Argentine politician. She was Minister of Security under President Mauricio Macri and is the chairwoman of Republican Proposal.

Born in Buenos Aires, Bullrich graduated from the University of Palermo and as a young woman was involved with the Peronist Youth.

Following the election of Mauricio Macri to the presidency on 22 November 2015, it was announced that Bullrich had been nominated the Minister of Security of Argentina.

Political career
After the return of democracy, she became Organisation Secretary of the Justicialist Party of Buenos Aires and was elected as a Peronist deputy in 1993. In 1995 she was named the Legislator of the year.

Disillusioned with the Peronist cause, Bullrich left Congress in 1997 and set up the UPT, originally as a vehicle for studying and campaigning on the subject of crime and security. From 1996 to 1999, she was a member of Gustavo Béliz's New Leadership party. She worked for the state government in Buenos Aires Province on security matters, developing a community policing project in Hurlingham which became well known nationally and internationally.

In 1999, the UPT became part of the Alliance for Work, Justice and Education which took Fernando de la Rúa to the Presidency and Bullrich was appointed to office in the Department of Criminal Policy and Penitentiary Matters. In 2001, she was made a cabinet minister, as Secretary of Labour, Employment and Human Resources, and later that year as Secretary of Social Security. During the 2001 economic crisis, she led the plan to substantially reduce the pay of state employees and the level of state pensions.

Following the collapse of the Alliance government of De la Rúa, Bullrich and her colleagues formally launched UPT as a political party, on 6 March 2002. The following year, the Party participated in the elections for Buenos Aires City, with Bullrich as the candidate for Head of Government for the Alianza Unión para Recrear Buenos Aires, working with the Recrear movement of Ricardo López Murphy. They came fourth with almost 10% of the vote.

In 2007, Bullrich led UPT into the Civic Coalition (2007–2011) alongside various opposition groups and social movements, principally ARI led by Elisa Carrió. The Coalition won several seats in the upper and lower houses of Congress and Bullrich herself was elected as National Deputy for Buenos Aires. Her centrist politics and polemical history as a government minister, however, contributed to the disenchantment of a group of left-wing members of ARI who left the Civic Coalition.

Following the election of Mauricio Macri to the presidency on 22 November 2015, it was announced on 25 November 2015 that Bullrich had been nominated the Minister of Security of the Nation.

Controversies
Bullrich stated that she was favor of arming of citizens, stating "whoever wants to be armed should be armed" after exiting a restaurant. 

In addition, due to her role as minister of Defense, she was accused of being responsible for murderer of Rafael Nahuel and Santiago Maldonado, it was eventually determined that he drowned.

D'Alessio Extortion Scandal 
According to the Human Rights Watch (HRW), Bullrich was implicated in the D'Alessio scandal, in which Marcelo D'Alessio was accused of extorting various individuals using real evidence obtained through hidden cameras or otherwise obtained from their private lives, and/or planted evidence, in order to "force people to confess to crimes or implicate others." According to HRW, "intercepted communications suggest that Patricia Bullrich, the security minister, 'had links' and 'gave instructions' to D’Alessio."

Electoral history

References

1956 births
Living people
Politicians from Buenos Aires
Argentine people of German descent
Government ministers of Argentina
Members of the Argentine Chamber of Deputies elected in Buenos Aires
Justicialist Party politicians
Women members of the Argentine Chamber of Deputies
Women government ministers of Argentina
20th-century Argentine women politicians
20th-century Argentine politicians
21st-century Argentine women politicians
21st-century Argentine politicians
University of Palermo (Buenos Aires) alumni